The 2002–03 Libyan Premier League was the 35th edition of the competition organised by the Libyan Football Federation, since the competition's inception in 1963. 14 sides competed in this season's competition, shown below. Al Ittihad won their second title in a row, their 10th overall. They were awarded the Libyan Star, and the golden star upon their badge signifies this.

Participating teams
Al Ittihad
Al Nasr
Al Madina
Al Hilal
Al Sweahly
Al Ahly Tripoli
Al Olomby
Wefaq Sabratha
Al Tahaddi
Al Tersanah
Al Wahda
Rafik Sorman
Al Dhahra
Al Suqoor

League table

Libyan Premier League seasons
1
Libyan Premier League